Brother and Sister is a 2010 Argentine comedy film directed by Daniel Burman.

Plot 
The film tells the story of two brothers who have a love-hate relationship. The recent death of his mother will increase the conflicts between the two. The story takes place in Buenos Aires in Argentina and then moves to the small town of Carmelo, in the Uruguayan department of Colonia.

Cast 
 Antonio Gasalla as Marcos
 Graciela Borges as Susana
 Elena Lucena as Mother of Marcos and Susana
 Rita Cortese as Alicia
 Osmar Núñez as Mario

References

External links 

2010 comedy films
2010 films
Films directed by Daniel Burman
Argentine comedy films
2010s Argentine films